Bizon may refer to:
 Bizon SMG, Russian submachine gun
 John Bizon (born 1951), American politician
 ST Bizon, Polish tugboat
 Bizon (company), Polish combine harvester manufacturer

See also 
 Bison (disambiguation)
 Bizone (disambiguation)